Joey Madigan (born December 6, 1989) is an American soccer player who currently plays for Real Colorado Foxes in the USL Premier Development League.

Career
Out of college, Madigan trialed with Major League Soccer club FC Dallas, but was cut by the team on January 30, 2012.

After spending 2012 with USL PDL club Real Colorado Foxes, Madigan signed with USL Pro club Dayton Dutch Lions on March 27, 2013.

References

External links
 Eagles bio
 Skyhawks bio

1989 births
Living people
American soccer players
Georgia Southern Eagles men's soccer players
Fort Lewis Skyhawks men's soccer players
Real Colorado Foxes players
Dayton Dutch Lions players
Association football forwards
Soccer players from Colorado
USL League Two players
USL Championship players